Salvador Llopis Soler (2 July 1950 – 9 January 2014), better known as simply Cota, was a Spanish footballer who primarily played as a goalkeeper.

Salvador Llopis died on 9 January 2014, aged 63, in his hometown of Oliva, Valencian Community.

References

1950 births
2014 deaths
People from Safor
Sportspeople from the Province of Valencia
Spanish footballers
Association football goalkeepers